Town Hall Los Angeles is a non-profit speaker's forum based in Los Angeles.  It was founded in 1937.  It has hosted over 3500 unpaid speakers, including 

 John F. Kennedy
 Robert F. Kennedy
 Ronald Reagan
 Condoleezza Rice
 General Anthony Zinni
 Russ Feingold
 Dianne Feinstein
 Arnold Schwarzenegger
 Prince Turki Al-Faisal

External links
 Town Hall Los Angeles — official site

Culture of Los Angeles